The Theme of Sebasteia was a military-civilian province (thema or theme) of the Byzantine Empire located in northeastern Cappadocia and Armenia Minor, in modern Turkey. It was established as a theme in 911 and endured until its fall to the Seljuk Turks in the aftermath of the Battle of Manzikert in 1071.

History
The theme was formed around the city of Sebasteia (modern Sivas). The region formed part of the Armeniac Theme from the mid-7th century. The theme is not mentioned in any source prior to the 10th century. In 908, Sebasteia appears for the first time as a distinct fortified frontier district (kleisoura), and by 911 it had been raised to the status of a full theme. As a kleisoura, it was probably subordinate of the newly established theme of Charsianon.

The theme comprised the entirety of the Byzantine frontier regions along the middle course of the northern Euphrates. With the expansion of the Byzantine frontier, it was extended south and east as far as Melitene, Samosata and Tephrike, corresponding roughly to the ancient Roman provinces of Armenia Prima and parts of Armenia Secunda and Syria Euphratensis. After the mid-10th century, however, its extent was much reduced by the creation of new smaller themes. According to Constantine VII Porphyrogennetos, the theme comprised two districts (tourmai): Larissa (south of modern Mancınık) and Amara or Abara (modern Amran near Arguvan or Emirköy).

In the 10th century, the region experienced a great influx of Armenians, who became the dominant population. After 1019/1021, Sebasteia and adjoining lands were given as a fief to the Armenian Seneqerim Ardzruni, in exchange for the cession to the Empire of his kingdom of Vaspurakan. From c. 1074, following the Byzantine defeat against the Seljuk Turks at Manzikert in 1071, the Ardzruni ruled the territory as independent lords, until it was conquered by the Turks around 1090.

References

Sources

 

Themes of the Byzantine Empire
Byzantine Anatolia
States and territories disestablished in the 1070s
911 establishments